Kenneth Harold Kuhn (March 20, 1937 – July 16, 2010) was an infielder in Major League Baseball for three seasons.

Early life
Kuhn was a four-sport star (baseball, football, basketball, and track) at Louisville Male High School, noted in 1955 (before Muhammad Ali), as "possibly the greatest all-around athlete ever to come out of Louisville."

Baseball career
After his major league career, he played minor league baseball until 1963, including the Dallas Rangers of the Texas League.

Later life
After retirement from baseball Kuhn worked for various companies, including Kentucky Fried Chicken, Mister Donut and Children's Discovery Centers.  In 1999 he moved to Truckee, California and worked at a Lake Tahoe resort.

He died, aged 73, in Layton, Utah, from pancreatic cancer. He was survived by wife Peggy and their four children, Carrie, Amy, Scott and Stan.

References

External links

1937 births
2010 deaths
Baseball players from Louisville, Kentucky
Burlington Indians players (1958–1964)
Cleveland Indians players
Dallas Rangers players
Deaths from cancer in Utah
Deaths from pancreatic cancer
Jacksonville Suns players
Major League Baseball infielders
Mobile Bears players
Reading Indians players
Salt Lake City Bees players
San Diego Padres (minor league) players